Guilherme Leoni de Moura Macuglia known as Guilherme Macuglia (born August 27, 1961 in Porto Alegre), is a Brazilian retired footballer who played as a forward, and the current manager of Central de Caruaru.

Club statistics

Honours

Player 
 Grêmio
 Campeonato Gaúcho U-20: 1979

 Esportivo
 Copa Governador do Rio Grande do Sul: 1980

 São Luiz
 Campeonato Gaúcho Série B: 1989

Manager 
Criciúma
 Campeonato Brasileiro Série C: 2006

Rio Branco
 Campeonato Acreano: 2012

References

1961 births
Living people
Footballers from Porto Alegre
Brazilian football managers
Brazilian footballers
Campeonato Brasileiro Série B managers
Campeonato Brasileiro Série C managers
Campeonato Brasileiro Série D managers
Grêmio Foot-Ball Porto Alegrense players
América Futebol Clube (SP) players
Clube Esportivo Bento Gonçalves players
Figueirense FC players
Avaí FC players
Esporte Clube São Luiz players
Esporte Clube São Luiz managers
Grêmio Esportivo Brasil managers
Associação Chapecoense de Futebol managers
Clube 15 de Novembro managers
Clube Esportivo Bento Gonçalves managers
Esporte Clube Novo Hamburgo managers
Criciúma Esporte Clube managers
Joinville Esporte Clube managers
Coritiba Foot Ball Club managers
Figueirense FC managers
Associação Desportiva São Caetano managers
Guarani FC managers
América Futebol Clube (RN) managers
Clube Náutico Capibaribe managers
Sociedade Esportiva e Recreativa Caxias do Sul managers
Paraná Clube managers
Clube Náutico Marcílio Dias managers
Central Sport Club managers
Rio Branco Sport Club players
Ypiranga Futebol Clube managers
Association football forwards